James Woods (born 1947) is an American film and television actor.

James Woods may also refer to:
 James H. Woods, American politician from New York in 1833
 James B. Woods (died 1875), merchant and political figure in Newfoundland
 James Woods (Canadian business executive) (1855–1941), Canadian industrialist and philanthropist
 James Woods (footballer), English footballer who played for Burnley in the 1880s
 James P. Woods (1868–1948), American politician, U.S. Representative from Virginia
 James Frank Woods (1872–1930), major landowner during the Kingdom of Hawaii
 James Park Woods (1886–1963), Australian soldier and recipient of the Victoria Cross
 Jim Woods (1916–1988), American sportscaster
 Jimmy Woods (1934–2018), American jazz musician
 Jimmy Woods (American football) (1894–1966), American football player
 Jim Woods (baseball) (born 1939), American baseball player
 James A. Woods (born 1979), Canadian actor
 James Woods (freestyle skier) (born 1992), British freestyle skier
 J. D. Woods (James Dominick Woods, 1826–1905), South Australian journalist and author
 James Woods, a character in Family Guy

See also
 James Wood (disambiguation)